Gregory Dale Server (born January 27, 1939) is an American former politician from the state of Indiana. A Republican, he served in the Indiana General Assembly from 1972 to 2005. He served on the Indiana Utility Regulatory Commission from 2005 to 2009. He was appointed to the Indiana Parole Board by Mitch Daniels in 2009. Server replaced Christopher Meloy.

References

Living people
1939 births
Indiana state senators